"Sincerità" is the debut single by the Italian singer Arisa and it was released on 18 February 2009. It placed first in the 'Newcomers' section and won the 'Mia Martini' Critics Award in the Sanremo Music Festival 2009.

Charts

Year-end charts

References 

2009 debut singles
2009 songs
Arisa songs
Italian-language songs
Number-one singles in Italy
Sanremo Music Festival songs
Songs written by Giuseppe Anastasi
Warner Music Group singles